Paxton is a historic home located near Powhatan, Powhatan County, Virginia. It was built about 1819, and is a two-story, three bay, Federal style brick I-house dwelling. It has a -story side wing. Also on the property are the contributing brick smokehouse, two small early-19th century one-room-plan frame dwellings, a 19th-century brick and frame icehouse, a late-19th century frame barn, and a family cemetery.

It was added to the National Register of Historic Places in 1990.

References

Houses on the National Register of Historic Places in Virginia
Federal architecture in Virginia
Houses completed in 1819
Houses in Powhatan County, Virginia
National Register of Historic Places in Powhatan County, Virginia